The 2018 Abilene Christian Wildcats football team represented Abilene Christian University in the 2018 NCAA Division I FCS football season. The Wildcats were led by second-year head coach Adam Dorrel and played their home games at Anthony Field at Wildcat Stadium. They played as a member of the Southland Conference. They finished the season 6–5, 5–4 in Southland play to finish in a four-way tie for fourth place.

Previous season
The Wildcats finished the 2017 season 2–9, 2–7 in Southland play to finish in eighth place.

Preseason

Preseason All-Conference Teams
On July 12, 2018, the Southland announced their Preseason All-Conference Teams, with the Wildcats placing one player on the second team.

Defense Second Team
 Bollu Onifade – So. DB

Preseason Poll
On July 19, 2018, the Southland announced their preseason poll, with the Wildcats predicted to finish in seventh place.

Schedule

Source:

Game summaries

at Baylor

at Houston Baptist

at Stephen F. Austin

Incarnate Word

at McNeese State

Nicholls

at Southeastern Louisiana

Northwestern State

at Sam Houston State

Central Arkansas

References

Abilene Christian
Abilene Christian Wildcats football seasons
Abilene Christian Wildcats football